Monocentris reedi is a species of ray-finned fish within the family Monocentridae. The species is found in the southeastern Pacific near Chile off the Juan Fernández Islands, Nazca Ridge and the Desventuradas Islands, where it lives a demersal lifestyle inhabiting tide pools, caves, and deep rocky reefs at depths of 10 to 250 meters. It grows to lengths of 9.2 to 9.9 centimeters.

Monocentris reedi has been assessed as a 'least concern' species by the IUCN Red List as despite its small and limited range, it has no known major threats.

References 

Taxa named by Leonard Peter Schultz
IUCN Red List least concern species
Fish described in 1956
Monocentridae
Fish of Chile
Fish of the Pacific Ocean